John Egglestone (7 July 1847 – 17 October 1912) was an Australian cricketer. He played two first-class cricket matches for Victoria in 1869.

See also
 List of Victoria first-class cricketers

References

1847 births
1912 deaths
Australian cricketers
Victoria cricketers
Cricketers from Hobart